The 2007 Speedway Grand Prix was the 62nd edition of the official World Championship and the 13th season in the Speedway Grand Prix era used to determine the Speedway World Champion. It was the first under the promotion of IMG, who had purchased series organisers Benfield Sports International (BSI).

Event format 
The format for 2007 was a revision of that used in 2006, with 16 riders taking part in each Grand Prix and over the course of 20 heats each rider racing against every other rider once.  The top 8 scorers advanced to a semi-final and from each semi-final the 1st and 2nd placed riders advanced to the Grand Prix final.

All rides counted towards Grand Prix points totals, including the semi-final and final, which counted as double (6-4-2-0) and therefore the maximum points for a single Grand Prix was 24 (5x heat wins, semi final win and final win). This scoring revision was introduced as a result of comments made during 2006 that the four finalists received too many points compared to the losing semi-finalists who received little benefit compared to the 9th placed non-qualifier. This format also meant that the winner of each Grand Prix may not be the rider who scores most Grand Prix points from each race.

Cities 
Cities of 2007 Grand Prix:
 Bydgoszcz
 Cardiff
 Copenhagen
 Daugavpils
  Eskilstuna
 Gelsenkirchen
 Krško
 Målilla
 Prague
 Wrocław

Qualification for Grand Prix 

For the 2007 season, there were 15 permanent riders joined at each Grand Prix by one wild card. The top eight riders from the 2006 championship qualified as of right, although as Hans Andersen had already qualified the 9th placed rider was also included. These eight qualifiers were, in championship order:-

 (1) Jason Crump 
 (2) Greg Hancock 
 (3) Nicki Pedersen 
 (4) Andreas Jonsson 
 (5) Leigh Adams 
 (7) Matej Žagar 
 (8) Tomasz Gollob 
 (9) Jarosław Hampel 

They were joined by three riders who qualified via the Grand Prix Qualifying final. These riders were, in order by qualifying position:-

 (13) Wiesław Jaguś 
 (14) Rune Holta 
 (6) Hans Andersen 

The final four riders were nominated by series promoters, Benfield Sports International, following the completion of the 2006 Grand Prix season.

 (10) Antonio Lindbäck 
 (11) Scott Nicholls 
 (12) Bjarne Pedersen 
 (15) Chris Harris

Calendar

Final standings

See also

References 

 
2007
2007 in speedway